Gary Berntsen (born July 23, 1957) is an American former Central Intelligence Agency (CIA) career officer who served in the Directorate of Operations between October 1982 and June 2005. During his time at the CIA, he served as a CIA Station Chief on three occasions and led several of the CIA’s most important counterterrorism deployments including the United States’ response to the East Africa Embassy bombings and the 9/11 attacks. Notable and extremely rare possessing both, Berntsen was awarded the Distinguished Intelligence Medal in 2000 and the Intelligence Star in 2004. 

He ran for the US Senate in 2010 for Chuck Schumer's seat, but lost the Republican primary to Jay Townsend, who in turn lost the general election.

Early life and education 
Berntsen grew up in Smithtown, Long Island, a suburb of New York City. When Berntsen was seventeen, he tried to join the United States Army but his parents would not sign the enlistment contract. He waited until his eighteenth birthday when he decided to enlist in the Air Force. Berntsen served for four years as a Crash Firefighter in the Air Force, including tours in Alaska and Korea. During his time in the United States Air Force he became obsessed with educating himself by reading biographies and enrolling in the Air Force's self-study program, acing several courses. Berntsen also spent much of his time in the gym or skydiving. After Berntsen's time as a firefighter he became a full-time college student graduating from the University of New Mexico with a Bachelor of Arts in Political Science and a minor in Russian Studies. He attended the U.S. Marine Corps Platoon Leader Class for two summers. However, before he was commissioned in the Marine Corps, he was recruited into the CIA.

CIA career 
In August 1998 Berntsen led the response team to the U.S. Embassy in Dar es Salaam. The subsequent investigation led to the capture of some 21 individuals involved with the planning and execution of the attacks.

Berntsen served as Chief of Hezbollah Operations prior to deploying to Afghanistan in March 2000 as a part of a CIA team that planned on capturing a senior Al Qaeda leader.  Berntsen writes that though leaders at the CIA, particularly Cofer Black and Henry A. Crumpton "had shown a willingness to plan and execute risky missions," top US government leadership including President Bill Clinton and CIA Director George Tenet were unprepared to take the increased risks.  It is recognized that the environment for covert CIA operations in areas of Central Asia significantly shifted after the September 11 attacks in 2001 on New York City and Washington, D.C.  The legitimacy for conducting such operations received widespread recognition and the actions carried out by CIA personnel after the attacks allowed for greater efficacy in targeting Al Qaeda personnel planning and conducting operations against US interests.  Furthermore, Berntsen's mission was also undermined by a CIA station chief in a neighboring country, dubbed Lawrence, who contacted CIA Headquarters calling for the mission to be called off.  The mission was never executed and the CIA's indecision would lead the Northern Alliance's leader Ahmad Shah Massoud to conclude that the US was "not serious" about fighting the Taliban.

In December 2001 fluent in Farsi and Spanish, Berntsen served as the Commander of all CIA forces in Eastern Afghanistan and led the agency’s Jawbreaker team in Tora Bora.  With a new President and the United States rattled by 9/11, Berntsen returned to Afghanistan with significantly different instructions.

In his 2005 book, Jawbreaker, he alleges that Osama bin Laden could have been captured at Tora Bora if the US military (specifically United States Central Command) had devoted more resources to the operation.  This claim gained substantial traction due to a Senate Report on the circumstances of bin Laden's escape.  According to both Berntsen's account and the Senate Committee's report, "Bin Laden and bodyguards walked unmolested out of Tora Bora and disappeared into Pakistan's unregulated tribal area."

Recent activities 

Gary released his first piece of fiction in August 2008. The book is titled The Walk-In and tells the story of an American CIA case officer dealing with an Iranian defector from the Quds Force. The defector claims that a catastrophic attack is imminent and the American case officer must decide what to believe.

In November 2008, Berntsen published Human Intelligence, Counterterrorism, and National Leadership: A Practical Guide. This book was written to serve as a manual for the incoming president and White House staff and includes highly specific recommendations and policy prescriptions for human intelligence and counterterrorism operations.

Berntsen continues expressing his opinions and analysis to the news media and several government entities including police departments and federal agencies.

Campaign for US Senate 

On May 23, 2010, Berntsen officially announced his candidacy for the New York Senate Seat currently held by Chuck Schumer. Berntsen's political campaign believes his national stature, his current ability to effect public policy, and his experience as a clandestine CIA operative make him a strong candidate for elected office.  On June 1, 2010, with considerable support from the New York Tea Party movement, Berntsen was named the Republican designee for US Senate against incumbent US Senator Chuck Schumer from New York and faced a Republican primary against Jay Townsend who received the Conservative party designation.  After the GOP designation, personal endorsements from Republican leaders in New York began accumulating for the Berntsen campaign, including Representative Peter King. In addition to the Republican nomination, Carl Paladino declared Berntsen his nominee for Senate on his "Taxpayers Party" line.

Jay Townsend defeated Berntsen in the September 14, 2010 primary, 55 percent to 45 percent.

See also
Gary Schroen
Battle of Tora Bora

Bibliography
 Berntsen, Gary & Pezzullo, Ralph. (2005). Jawbreaker: The attack on bin Laden and al-Qaeda: A personal account by the CIA's key field commander. Crown. . 
 Berntsen, Gary & Pezzullo, Ralph. (2008). The Walk-In. Crown. .
 Berntsen, Gary. (2008). Human Intelligence, Counterterrorism, and National Leadership: A Practical Guide. Potomac Books Inc. .

Footnotes

References 
 Berntsen, G & Pezzullo, R (2005). Jawbreaker, Crown Publishing

External links
 GaryforNewYork.com Gary Berntsen for US Senate - Official Gary Berntsen for Senate website, providing information about his Senate campaign
 (Link inactive) Berntsen National Security Review – Official Gary Berntsen Blog on National Security Issues
 BerntsenGroup.com  Berntsen Group- Official Website of Gary Berntsen's Company
 
 Middle East Institute Book Launch with Gary Berntsen - Human Intelligence, Counterterrorism, and National Leadership:  A Practical Guide (October 17, 2008)
 More Troops Are Nice, but More Intelligence Needed to Save Afghan War – Jeff Stein writing for CQ Politics (October 31, 2008)
 CIA Commander: U.S. Let bin Laden Slip Away - Michael Hirsh writing for Newsweek (August 15, 2005)

1957 births
Living people
American spies
People of the Central Intelligence Agency
American political writers
American male non-fiction writers
New York (state) Republicans
People from Smithtown, New York
United States Air Force airmen
Recipients of the Intelligence Star
Recipients of the Distinguished Intelligence Medal